In Greek mythology, Hero was one of the sons of king Priam mentioned in Hyginus Fabulae. His mother's name is unknown. Possibly he was killed by Achilles or Neoptolemus.

Popular culture
Hero is the protagonist of Canadian-British series Olympus where he is portrayed by Tom York.

Note

References 

 Gaius Julius Hyginus, Fabulae from The Myths of Hyginus translated and edited by Mary Grant. University of Kansas Publications in Humanistic Studies. Online version at the Topos Text Project.

Princes in Greek mythology
Trojans